Ptychopseustis conisphoralis is a moth in the family Crambidae. It is found in China (Tianjin).

References

Cybalomiinae
Moths described in 1919